In law and government, de jure describes practices that are legally recognized, regardless of whether the practice exists in reality. In contrast,  ("in fact") describes situations that exist in reality, even if not legally recognized.

Examples
Between 1805 and 1914, the ruling dynasty of Egypt were subject to the rulers of the Ottoman Empire, but acted as de facto independent rulers who maintained a polite fiction of Ottoman suzerainty. However, starting from around 1882, the rulers had only de jure rule over Egypt, as it had by then become a British puppet state. Thus, by Ottoman law, Egypt was de jure a province of the Ottoman Empire, but de facto was part of the British Empire.

In U.S. law, particularly after Brown v. Board of Education (1954), the difference between de facto segregation (segregation that existed because of the voluntary associations and neighborhoods) and de jure segregation (segregation that existed because of local laws that mandated the segregation) became important distinctions for court-mandated remedial purposes.

In a hypothetical situation, a king or emperor could be the de jure head of state. However, if they are unfit to rule the country, the prime minister or chancellor would usually become the practical, or de facto leader, while the king remains the de jure leader. For example, Edward V was de jure King of England for a part of 1483, but he was never crowned and his uncle Richard III was the de facto king during this period.

See also

List of Latin phrases (D)
Implied repeal
Obrogation
Unenforced law

References

Latin legal terminology